Hust or HUST may refer to:

 Hanoi University of Science and Technology in Hanoi, Vietnam
 Harbin University of Science and Technology in Harbin, Heilongjiang, China
 Harrisburg University of Science and Technology in Harrisburg, Pennsylvania, USA
 Hsiuping University of Science and Technology in Taichung, Taiwan
 Huazhong University of Science and Technology in Wuhan, Hubei, China
 Khust in western Ukraine